Robert Steiner may refer to:

 Robert Steiner (footballer) (born 1973), Swedish professional footballer
 Robert Steiner (radiologist) (1918–2013), British radiologist
 Robert Steiner (writer) (born 1976), German mountain climber and writer
 Rob Steiner (born 1944), Canadian tap dancer of The Steiner Brothers
 Bob Steiner (1946–2020), Canadian football player

See also
 Robert Stein (disambiguation)